The Origins of Ruin is the third studio release of the progressive metal band Redemption.  It is Redemption's first album with InsideOut Music and the first album with Sean Andrews on the bass guitars.

Track listing

Import bonus tracks
Love to Love - UFO cover

Personnel
 Ray Alder - vocals
 Nick van Dyk - guitars, keyboards
 Bernie Versailles - guitars
 Sean Andrews - bass
 Chris Quirarte - drums

External links
Official Redemption website
Redemption's Official Myspace

2007 albums
Redemption (band) albums
Inside Out Music albums